The 2023 FC Astana season is the fifteenth successive season that FC Astana will play in the Kazakhstan Premier League, the highest tier of association football in Kazakhstan.

Season events
On 16 December 2022, Astana announced the signing of Dušan Jovančić from Tobol.

On 15 January, Astana announced the return of Žarko Tomašević from Tobol. Two days later, 17 January, Aleksa Amanović became the third player to join Astana from Tobol during the winter transfer window. Later the same day, Astana announced new contract with Sultan Sagnaev, Stanislav Basmanov, Vladislav Prokopenko, Talgat Kusyapov and Danil Podymsky.

On 26 January, Astana announced the signing of Josip Čondrić from Zrinjski Mostar, and the year-long loan signing of Dembo Darboe from Al-Nasr.

On 13 February, Astana announced the signing of Fabien Ourega from Žalgiris.

On 13 March, Astana announced the signing of Elkhan Astanov from Ordabasy.

Squad

On loan

Transfers

In

Loans in

Loans out

Released

Friendlies

Competitions

Overview

Super Cup

Premier League

Results summary

Results by round

Results

League table

Kazakhstan Cup

Group stage

UEFA Champions League

Qualifying rounds

Squad statistics

Appearances and goals

|-
|colspan="16"|Players away from Astana on loan:
|-
|colspan="16"|Players who left Astana during the season:
|}

Goal scorers

Clean sheets

Disciplinary record

References

External links
Official Website 
Official VK

FC Astana seasons